"Love Zone" is the title track from Billy Ocean's 1986 album. In the US, The ballad hit number one on the Billboard R&B chart and was his third single to hit the top spot. "Love Zone" also reached number ten on the Billboard Hot 100 and number five on the Adult Contemporary chart.

Chart performance

Weekly charts

Year-end charts

Popular Culture
The song was used for the characters of Tina Lord and Cord Roberts on the American soap opera One Life to Live.

References

1986 singles
1986 songs
Billy Ocean songs
Funk songs
Jive Records singles